Ophiusa disjungens, the guava moth, is a moth of the family Erebidae. The species was first described by Francis Walker in 1858. It is found in south-east Asia and the south Pacific, including Thailand, Japan, Tonga and New South Wales and Queensland. The adult is a fruit piercer.

Description
Similar to Ophiusa discriminans, differs in head and thorax being yellowish grey. Abdomen lack black patch. Forewings yellowish grey without black specks. A maculate line runs beyond the postmedial line. A grey and dark patch beyond the sub-apical spots, and hardly a trace of the patch at anal angle. A dentate sub-marginal line with the area beyond it reddish. Hindwing orange with the black reduced to a submarginal medial patch.

Larva pale brownish, with numerous waved longitudinal black lines, between which are black specks series. There are some red between each pair of legs, and a black patch between each pair of prolegs. Small pared dorsal prominences found on 11th somites. The larvae feed on various Myrtaceae species, including Eucalyptus, Syncarpia glomulifera and Psidium guajava.

Gallery

References

External links
Japanese Moths
Characterization of the deoxyuridine triphosphatase gene of Ophiusa disjungens nucleopolyhedrovirus.

Ophiusa
Moths of Asia
Moths of Japan
Moths described in 1858